Seattle 2007 is an official live recording by the band VAST and was released in 2007. It was made available as an online download.

Track listing
"Here" – 4:43
"Pretty When You Cry" – 3:56
"Falling from the Sky" – 3:04
"Thrown Away" – 3:59
"Touched" – 4:32
"I Don't Have Anything" – 3:25
"The Last One Alive/Free" – 7:10
"Blue" – 4:17
"Desert Garden" – 3:03
"Tattoo of Your Name" – 3:45
"You're Too Young" – 3:12
"Flames" – 4:06
"Temptation" – 3:35
"Turquoise" – 3:22
"My TV and You" – 2:47
"Three Doors" – 5:01

References

VAST albums
2007 live albums